Habitaciones Extrañas is the third album by the rock band Enanitos Verdes, released in 1987. The album was recorded and mixed in Estudios Panda in Buenos Aires in the fall of 1987.

Track listing 

 El Extraño de Pelo Largo [The stranger of long hair] - 2:52
 Por el Resto [For the rest] - 4:20
 Derribando Sueños [Demolishing dreams] - 2:56
 Pasos [Steps] - 4:08
 Sumar Tiempo No Es Sumar Amor [Adding time is not Adding love] - 3:35
 Te Ví En Un Tren [I saw you in a train] - 4:00
 Encerrado Sin Amor [Locked without love] - 3:00
 Sólo Alguien Como Vos [Only somebody like you] - 2:38
 Vivo Dos Veces [I live twice] - 2:40
 La Misma Luna [The same moon] - 3:13
 Atrapado [Caught] - 3:19

1987 albums
Enanitos Verdes albums